The 2015–16 Binghamton Bearcats women's basketball team represented Binghamton University during the 2015–16 NCAA Division I women's basketball season. The Bearcats were led by second year head coach Linda Cimino and played their home games at Binghamton University Events Center. They were members of the America East Conference. They finished the season 14–17, 8–8 in America East play to finish in a 3-way tie for fourth place. They advanced to the semifinals of the America East women's tournament where they lost to Albany.

Media
All home games and conference road games will stream on either ESPN3 or AmericaEast.tv. Most road games will stream on the opponents website. All games will be broadcast on the radio on WNBF and streamed online.

Roster

Schedule

|-
!colspan=9 style="background:#006B54; color:#FFFFFF;"| Exhibition

|-
!colspan=9 style="background:#006B54; color:#FFFFFF;"| Non-conference regular season

|-
!colspan=9 style="background:#006B54; color:#FFFFFF;"| American East regular season

|-
!colspan=9 style="background:#006B54; color:#FFFFFF;"| America East Women's Tournament

See also
2015–16 Binghamton Bearcats men's basketball team

References

Binghamton Bearcats women's basketball seasons
Binghamton
Binghamton Bearcats women's basketball
Binghamton Bearcats women's basketball